The Antica Dolceria Bonajuto is a chocolate factory founded in Modica in 1880, known to be the oldest in Sicily and one of the oldest in Italy and for having been frequented by illustrious people of international fame.

History 

In 1820, Vincenzo Bonajuto died prematurely, leaving ten children and the elder Francesco Ignazio invested the inherited estate in a series of commercial activities.
The Bonajuto were, in the first half of the 19th century, ice sellers in the Hyblaean Mountains zone. Some vicissitudes led them to focus on the field of pastry, focused on chocolate.

Federico Bonajuto, son of Francesco Ignazio Bonajuto, in 1853 bought a frantoio to crush cacao beans and make the amara dough in his laboratory with the dialectical name "fattojo del ciccolatte", while in 1880 Francesco Bonajuto he founded the current place but with the name of Caffè Roma, a meeting place of socialist inspiration, which became Antica Dolceria Bonajuto in 1992.

Since the beginning of the 90s in Modica, the company has promoted national and international gastronomic tourism, as well as cultural, bringing the chocolate tradition of Modica, dormant in those years, to the glories of the past.
Franco Ruta, at the time owner of the chocolate shop, brought Modica chocolate to the fore since the end of the 90s through media appearances, including in a television show hosted by Maurizio Costanzo in 1999, in Omnibus (talk show) in 2002, and made it known internationally.

Throughout the years many illustrious patrons of the chocolate shop have been, among them are: writer, journalist and art critic Leonardo Sciascia, his friend and colleague Gesualdo Bufalino (winner of the Campiello Prize in 1981 and Strega Prize in 1988);
the intellectual and writer Raffaele Poidomani, the actor Alessandro Quasimodo, son of the Nobel Prize Modican Salvatore Quasimodo and the historian Giuseppe Barone.

The chocolate shop was also visited by New York Times journalist Raymond Walter Apple Jr. in 1999, then by his trip to Sicily; by Wall Street Journal correspondent Frederika Randall who has lived in Italy since 1986, that in 2002 the American journalist interviewed the owner Franco Ruta at the Corso Umberto I, and Lucinda Hawksley who wrote an article for BBC News.

Awards and acknowledgments 
In 1911, Francesco Bonajuto's chocolates won the gold medal at the Turin International which was organized together with other national exhibitions such as those of Rome (where Bonajuto was awarded) and Firenze.
In 2014, the company was included by Il Sole 24 Ore among the 10 century-old Italian companies that "improve the Italian economy in the world".

In 2017, was founded the Associazione Franco Ruta in honor of Franco Ruta.

Modica chocolate and PGI controversy

Modica chocolate, the main product of the city's "dolcerie", is obtained by "cold" processing (approximately 40 °) of the chocolate (which does not melt the sugar), which achieved the PGI recognition (Protected geographical indication) gives the European Union;but the Dolceria Bonajuto did not accept the disciplinary, considering it too permissive and not very grateful towards the company which had the merit of rediscovering the product.

The mass of cacao, obtained from roasted and ground seeds and not deprived of the cocoa butter contained in it, is heated to make it fluid. Is mixed with sugar granulated or cane, and can be enriched with spices such as cinnamon, vanilla, ginger, chili pepper, or with lemon or orange peel. The chocolate remains with high percentages of cocoa mass, minimum 50%, even in the "classic" versions up to the very pure versions with 99% cocoa mass. The strength of the product lies in the simplicity of processing, in the grainy and crumbly chewing thanks to both the lack of the conching phase and the sugar that occurs in crystals, and the absence of foreign substances (vegetable fats, milk, soy lecithin). Modica Chocolate often shows a white patina and tends to crumble. The phenomenon of cocoa butter surfacing.

The origin of the product dates back to the 17th century, to the period of Spanish Sicily after the Europeans discovered the technique of working with chocolate by the Aztecs.

Chocolate established itself in the social fabric in the second half of the 19th century thanks also to the progress of the food industry, which made the product accessible also to the less well-off classes. Modica product is manufactured today with the help of modern machines that respect the imposed rules.

Modica, in addition to being known as a Baroque city heritage of Unesco, is also known as the city of chocolate.

Bibliography 
 La dolceria Bonajuto. Storia della cioccolateria più antica di Sicilia, Giovanni Criscione, Palermo, Kalós edizioni d'arte, 2014.
 Il biscotto di legno, Raffaele Poidomani, Modica, Bonajuto, 2005.

See also
List of bean-to-bar chocolate manufacturers

References 

1880 establishments in Italy
Tourist attractions in Sicily
Companies based in Sicily
Modica
Italian brands
Companies in the Free municipal consortium of Ragusa
Italian chocolate companies